Statistics of Emperor's Cup in the 1986 season.

Overview
It was contested by 32 teams, and Yomiuri won the championship.

Results

1st round
Furukawa Electric (withdrew) – Hyōgo Teachers
Teijin 0–1 Osaka Gas
Yomiuri 3–1 Fukuoka University
Yawata Steel 1–1 (PK 8–7) Hitachi
Nissan Motors 3–0 Kawasaki Steel Mizushima
NTT Kansai 0–4 Mazda
Seino Transportation SC 3–2 Tanabe Pharmaceuticals
Kochi University 0–3 Fujita Industries
Honda 3–0 Kofu
All Nippon Airways 3–1 Fujieda City Hall S.C.
Matsushita Electric 1–1 (PK 3–1) Toyota Motors
Toshiba 0–1 Yamaha Motors
Mitsubishi Motors 4–2 Sapporo University
Waseda University 0–1 Yanmar Diesel
Kokushikan University 0–0 (PK 5–3) Akita City Hall
F.C. Ueda Gentian 1–7 Nippon Kokan

2nd round
Hyōgo Teachers 1–1 (PK 3–2) Osaka Gas
Yomiuri 2–1 Yawata Steel
Nissan Motors 2–0 Mazda
Seino Transportation SC 0–2 Fujita Industries
Honda 5–1 All Nippon Airways
Matsushita Electric 0–2 Yamaha Motors
Mitsubishi Motors 0–1 Yanmar Diesel
Kokushikan University 1–6 Nippon Kokan

Quarterfinals
Hyōgo Teachers 0–5 Yomiuri
Nissan Motors 2–0 Fujita Industries
Honda 2–2 (PK 2–4) Yamaha Motors
Yanmar Diesel 0–3 Nippon Kokan

Semifinals
Yomiuri 1–1 (PK 4–3) Nissan Motors
Yamaha Motors 0–1 Nippon Kokan

Final

Yomiuri 2–1 Nippon Kokan
Yomiuri won the championship Excluded from the Asian Cup Winners' Cup 1987.

References
 NHK

Emperor's Cup
Emperor's Cup
1987 in Japanese football